Alt Àneu is a municipality in the comarca of the Pallars Sobirà in Catalonia, Spain.
It is situated on the Noguera Pallaresa river, and is served by the C-13 road, which links 
it with Sort and (during the summer months) to the Aran Valley over the Port de la Bonaigua (2072 m). 
The ajuntament (town hall) is in València d'Àneu.

Subdivisions 
The municipality of Alt Àneu is formed of nine villages. Populations are given as of 2005:
Alòs d'Isil (34)
Àrreu (6)
La Bonaigua (16)
Borén (25), on the left bank of the Noguera Pallaresa
Isavarre (25)
Isil (85), in the upper valley
Son (46)
Sorpe (42)
València d'Àneu (175), on the right bank of the Noguera Pallaresa

Demography

References

 Panareda Clopés, Josep Maria; Rios Calvet, Jaume; Rabella Vives, Josep Maria (1989). Guia de Catalunya, Barcelona: Caixa de Catalunya.  (Spanish).  (Catalan).

External links
Official website 
 Government data pages 
Cycling Routes in Alt Àneu

Municipalities in Pallars Sobirà
Populated places in Pallars Sobirà